Maryna Kolesnykova (born 15 December 2000) is a female Ukrainian swimmer. She won one bronze medal at the inaugural European Games where she was third in 200 metre backstroke. She also competed in the 100 metre backstroke where she finished 4th as well as 50 metre backstroke where she reached semifinals and finished 10th.

Kolesnykova participated in the 2018 European Championships in Glasgow, Scotland, where she finished 27th in 200 metre backstroke. She also competed at the 2018 Summer Youth Olympics in Buenos Aires, Argentina. At the Games, she finished 20th in 200 metre backstroke and 21st in 100 metre backstroke.

References

2000 births
Living people
Ukrainian female swimmers
European Games medalists in swimming
European Games bronze medalists for Ukraine
Swimmers at the 2015 European Games
Swimmers at the 2018 Summer Youth Olympics
Sportspeople from Kharkiv Oblast
21st-century Ukrainian women